
Gmina Mochowo is a rural gmina (administrative district) in Sierpc County, Masovian Voivodeship, in east-central Poland. Its seat is the village of Mochowo, which lies approximately 12 kilometres (7 mi) south-west of Sierpc and 115 km (71 mi) north-west of Warsaw.

Villages
Gmina Mochowo contains the villages and settlements of Adamowo, Bendorzyn, Bożewo, Bożewo Nowe, Choczeń, Cieślin, Dobaczewo, Dobrzenice Małe, Florencja, Gozdy, Grabówiec, Grodnia, Kapuśniki, Kokoszczyn, Ligówko, Ligowo, Lisice Nowe, Łukoszyn, Łukoszyno-Biki, Malanówko, Malanowo Nowe, Malanowo Stare, Mochowo, Mochowo-Dobrzenice, Mochowo-Parcele, Myszki, Obręb, Osiek, Rokicie, Romatowo, Śniechy, Sulkowo Rzeczne, Sulkowo-Bariany, Żabiki, Załszyn, Zglenice Duże, Zglenice Małe, Zglenice-Budy, Żółtowo, Żuki, Żurawin and Żurawinek.

Neighbouring gminas
Gmina Mochowo is bordered by the gminas of Brudzeń Duży, Gozdowo, Sierpc, Skępe and Tłuchowo.

References
Polish official population figures 2006

Mochowo
Sierpc County